The sunburst flag is an Irish flag associated with early Irish nationalism, and more recently, youth wings of Irish republican groups such as Na Fianna Éireann. The flag is first thought to have been used in 1858 by the Irish Republican Brotherhood. The sunburst flag is still used today, by both republican groups and the Irish language and Gaelic revival organization Conradh na Gaeilge.

History and origins of the flag 
The sunburst flag's design is inspired by the Fianna of Irish mythology. Described as brave warriors who performed a large number of impressive feats, the Fianna referred to themselves as either Gal Gréine or Scal Ghréine, which both mean sunburst.
The earliest confirmed use of the sunburst flag is found in the 18th century as the guidon of the County Sligo Light Horse. The motto was as Post nubila Phoebus ("After the clouds Sun") symbolizing a new day.

The sunburst flag, and the symbol of the sunburst itself came into more common use by Irish nationalists during the 19th century. In 1858, the Irish Republican Brotherhood adopted the flag as their symbol. During the American Civil War, the sunburst motif was incorporated by several Irish regiments in their standards. In 1893 the Irish-language group called Conradh na Gaeilge established themselves, using the flag as the group's symbol in reference to the Fianna.

Communist Party of Ireland and dissident republican groups Republican Network for Unity and Saoradh have incorporated it into their emblems.

See also
 Nebra sky disk
 Rising Sun (badge), a badge of the Australian army
 Rising Sun Flag, a Japanese flag
 Starry Plough (flag)

References

Flags of Ireland
Irish Republican Brotherhood